Sean Albro Tuohy (born November 23, 1959) is an American sports commentator and restaurateur. He played college basketball at the University of Mississippi in the 1980s.

Tuohy, his wife Leigh Anne, and his family are a subject of Michael Lewis' 2006 book, The Blind Side: Evolution of a Game, and its 2009 feature film adaptation, The Blind Side, where he is portrayed by Tim McGraw. The book and subsequent film are based on the Tuohys' raising of National Football League (NFL) player Michael Oher, who played in the NFL from 2009 to 2016.

Early life
Tuohy is of Irish descent and was raised Catholic. Tuohy is the son of Mida (Michell) and Edward "Skeets" Tuohy, a basketball coach at the Isidore Newman School, in New Orleans, Louisiana, where the Tuohy Gymnasium is named in his honor.  Tuohy graduated from Newman. Out of high school, Tuohy was drafted by the Cincinnati Reds to play baseball, but turned down the offer to attend college. With sports as his "meal ticket" through high school and college, Tuohy left New Orleans for the University of Mississippi on a basketball scholarship.

College
Tuohy attended the University of Mississippi where he was a member of the Mississippi Alpha chapter of the Phi Delta Theta fraternity, played basketball, and also met his future wife Leigh Anne.

Tuohy led the Ole Miss Rebels to their first SEC men's basketball tournament championship in 1981. As a player at Ole Miss, Tuohy was named All-SEC in each of his four seasons. He was named to the All-Century SEC team and is the only basketball player in the history of the SEC to lead a statistical category for four years, as he did with assists. Tuohy holds the record for single season assists in the Southeastern Conference with 260. Tuohy is only the fourth basketball player ever chosen to the Ole Miss Sports Hall of Fame. Drafted by the NBA's New Jersey Nets with the 218th pick (Round 10) in 1982, he opted to continue his career overseas before returning to the U.S. to be with his father in his final days.

Career
Tuohy and his wife owned 115 fast food franchises, including those of Taco Bell, Kentucky Fried Chicken, Pizza Hut and Long John Silver's, but currently own 11, having sold the majority in six separate transactions.

Tuohy has also been a broadcaster for the Memphis Grizzlies of the NBA since 2001. He has seven years of experience as an analyst for radio broadcasts at Ole Miss, as well as national broadcasts for Westwood One and CBS Radio.

Tuohy and his wife are also the co-authors of the book, In a Heartbeat: Sharing the Power of Cheerful Giving, which was released in 2010.

Personal life
Tuohy married his wife, Leigh Anne, in 1982 and the couple have three children together. They have two sons, Sean Jr., who played guard for the Loyola Greyhounds, and former NFL player Michael Oher, who the couple adopted when he was 17, and one daughter, Collins, who was a state champion as a pole vaulter and cheerleader at the University of Mississippi. Tuohy and his wife live in Memphis, Tennessee.

References

1959 births
Living people
American men's basketball players
American people of Irish descent
American Roman Catholics
Basketball players from New Orleans
Isidore Newman School alumni
Memphis Grizzlies announcers
New Jersey Nets draft picks
Ole Miss Rebels men's basketball players
Point guards
Tuohy family